Obtusella is a genus of minute sea snails, marine gastropod mollusks or micromollusks in the family Rissoidae.

Species
Seven species are currently recognised in the genus Obtusella.
 Obtusella erinacea (Linnaeus, 1758)
 Obtusella intersecta (S. Wood, 1857) – syn. Obtusella alderi (Jeffreys, 1858)
 Obtusella lata Rolán & Rubio, 1999
 Obtusella macilenta (Monterosato, 1880)
 Obtusella orisparvi Moreno, Peñas & Rolán, 2003
 Obtusella roseotincta (Dautzenberg, 1889)
 Obtusella tumidula (G. O. Sars, 1878)

References

Further reading
 Ponder W. F. (1985). A review of the Genera of the Rissoidae (Mollusca: Mesogastropoda: Rissoacea). Records of the Australian Museum supplement 4: 1-221
 Vaught, K. C. (1989). A classification of the living Mollusca. American Malacologists: Melbourne, FL (USA). . XII, 195 pp.
 Gofas, S.; Le Renard, J.; Bouchet, P. (2001). Mollusca, in: Costello, M. J. et al. (Ed.) (2001). European register of marine species: a check-list of the marine species in Europe and a bibliography of guides to their identification. Collection Patrimoines Naturels, 50: pp. 180–213

External links

Rissoidae